The Wharehine River is a river in New Zealand. Located west of Wellsford, it is a tributary of the Oruawharo River.

See also
List of rivers of New Zealand

References

Rodney Local Board Area
Rivers of the Auckland Region
Kaipara Harbour catchment